Kaiser's rock rat (Aethomys kaiseri) is a species of rodent in the family Muridae 
found in Angola, Burundi, the Democratic Republic of the Congo, Kenya, Malawi, Rwanda, Tanzania, Uganda, and Zambia.
Its natural habitats are subtropical or tropical dry forests and subtropical or tropical moist montane forests.

References

Aethomys
Rodents of Africa
Mammals described in 1887
Taxonomy articles created by Polbot